Pasni Tehsil, is a subdivision (tehsil) of Gwadar District in the Balochistan province of Pakistan. It is administratively subdivided into four Union Councils, two of which form the tehsil capital Pasni.

References

Gwadar District
Tehsils of Balochistan, Pakistan